Carl or Karl Hamilton may refer to:

 Carl B. Hamilton (born 1946), Swedish count, economist and politician
 Carl Hamilton (fictional character), fictional secret agent created by Jan Guillou
 Carl L. Hamilton (1888–1946), American businessman
 Karl Didrik Hamilton, on the list of governors of Örebro County
 Karl Wilhelm de Hamilton, Brussels-born painter
 Carl Hamilton (American football), New Mexico Lobos football coach
 Carl Hamilton (Governor) on List of governors of Östergötland County
 Carl Hamilton, candidate in the 1977 Ontario general election